Shulgin Log is a rural locality (a selo) in Shulgin-Logsky Selsoviet, Sovetsky District, Altai Krai, Russia. The population was 856 as of 2013. There are 6 streets.

Geography 
Shulgin Log is located on the Katun River, 45 km southeast of Sovetskoye (the district's administrative centre) by road. Ust-Isha is the nearest rural locality.

References 

Rural localities in Sovetsky District, Altai Krai